Arotrophora fijigena is a species of moth of the family Tortricidae. It is found on Fiji in the South Pacific Ocean.

The wingspan is about 15 mm. The forewings are brown with a whitish mark in the subterminal part of the costa. The hindwings are greyish brown.

Etymology
The species name refers to Fiji plus Greek gen (meaning descendant).

References

Moths described in 2009
Fijigena
Moths of Fiji